Patrick Noble (1787April 7, 1840) was the 57th Governor of South Carolina from 1838 until his death in 1840.

Early life and career
Born in Abbeville District Present Day Mccormick County, South Carolina  near Willington, Noble was educated at Moses Waddel's School and he graduated from the College of New Jersey in 1806. Upon graduation, he was admitted to the bar in 1809 and commenced the practice of law with John C. Calhoun. Noble was additionally active with the South Carolina militia from 1813 to 1814 and he served as a major.

Political career
In 1814, Noble was elected to the South Carolina House of Representatives and was a member until 1824. The General Assembly elected Noble as the 34th Lieutenant Governor of South Carolina in 1830 for a two-year term. He was elected again to the House of Representatives upon the completion of his term as Lieutenant Governor in 1832 and he was elevated to the South Carolina Senate in 1836. Noble became Governor of South Carolina in 1838 upon election by the General Assembly. He was elected by 96-58 over Franklin H. Elmore. His term as governor was marked by the aftermath effects of the Panic of 1837 resulting in the Charleston banks suspending specie payments. Noble died on April 7, 1840 before the expiration of his term and he was buried in Willington at the family cemetery.

Family
Noble married Elizabeth Bonneau Pickens (1797-1834), daughter of Lieutenant Governor Ezekiel Pickens. They had seven children, of whom Edward (1820-1889), a lawyer, state representative, and major in the Confederate Army, was probably the most prominent. Samuel (1832-1890) served in the Confederate Army and was later a successful lawyer in Galveston, Texas.

References

External links 
SCIway Biography of Patrick Noble
NGA Biography of Patrick Noble

1787 births
1840 deaths
Princeton University alumni
South Carolina lawyers
Democratic Party members of the South Carolina House of Representatives
Lieutenant Governors of South Carolina
Democratic Party South Carolina state senators
Burials in South Carolina
Democratic Party governors of South Carolina
University of South Carolina trustees
People from Willington, South Carolina
19th-century American politicians
19th-century American lawyers